Kill It Kid was an English alternative rock band fronted by Chris Turpin (guitars & vocals). Members also include Stephanie Ward (Keys & vocals), Marc Jones (drums) and Dom Kozubik (bass guitar). 
 
The band was widely recognised as one of the best new acts of 2009, with magazines such as NME and Clash rating their debut album 8/10 and 9/10 respectively; the album was nominated for XFM's New Music Award 2010.

Kill it Kid released their first two albums with London indie label, One Little Indian Records, whose roster includes Björk, Paul McCartney and Skunk Anansie.  They signed a publishing deal with EMI Music in September 2011. In late 2012 the band signed a worldwide recording contract with legendary A&R man Seymour Stein, inking to his Warner Music imprint label Sire Records. Spring 2013 saw the band head to LA to begin work on their third studio Album 'You Owe Nothing', released August 2014 (Central Europe) & November 2014 (UK). On Friday 13 November 2015 the members of the band announced they were taking a break from Kill It Kid.

Influences and sound
Kill it Kid originally blended roots, rock and blues lead by vocals from both Chris Turpin and Stephanie Ward; their line-up has included slide guitar, fiddle and on rare occasion banjo. Although the band never really saw their music as folk, the band were initially linked to the British nu-folk revival.

Now a four piece, the band's output, as showcased in their album 'Feet Fall Heavy' (2011), is guitar-driven, drum heavy and raw, and has drawn comparisons to bands like The White Stripes. Chris Turpin describes the change in a 2011 interview: ‘It’s an entirely different record, it almost feels like a different band, to be honest. It’s just the reality of living and working in the music industry for two years and turning into a family band. You all become siblings which is a bit peculiar after like, the seventeenth day on the road. The main difference is there’s no violin and there’s no acoustic guitars, it’s a much heavier process. [...]'

The band are influenced by British Blues, Delta Blues & roots; the band's name is a reference to a Blind Willie McTell song, "Kill it Kid".

History
Kill it Kid met and formed in Bath, where its original band members lived (most were students at Bath Spa University): "I [Chris] was gigging on my own doing solo pre war acoustic blues, Steph was doing similar on the other side of the scale, Bessie Smith and all the early female blues. We started playing together in different little groups, I was playing behind her in some jazz concerts and she had come to see my shows. Marc [sic.] saw me at a solo gig, he backed me at some gigs. we then decided to get everyone in a room together."

In February 2008, John Parish (producer of PJ Harvey, Eels) was invited by a tutor at the University Chris, Marc & Steph attended to discuss recording. He took a group into the studio whilst students watched – Big Brother style. Kill It Kid were that guinea pig band.  "We sat and slogged for 12-hour days singing over and over again trying to get these songs right whilst 20 or so students sat the other room listening" explained KIK's vocalist Chris Turpin. "It was a bit strange – I don't know if there was tutoring going on or what."  The finished product became their debut EP, which drew increasing label interest.

Kill It Kid were signed to One Little Indian Records three months later and began touring the UK. In January 2009 they went to Seattle to record their debut album with producer Ryan Hadlock, (Foo Fighters, The Gossip, The Strokes) in Bear Creek Studios After two successful single releases, they released their self-titled debut album in October 2009, to critical acclaim. The album was subsequently nominated for XFM's New Music Award 2010.

Kill it Kid's second album, Feet Fall Heavy was produced by Leo Abrahams and recorded at Fortress Studios in Shoreditch over a period of ten days; it features samples of Alan Lomax field recordings, and has received widespread critical acclaim.  Feet Fall Heavy was to be released on 19 September 2011 but distribution was disrupted after rioters set fire to and destroyed a Sony warehouse in Enfield, North London (used by independent-music distributor PIAS) in which most of the existing physical copies of the album were being stored (see: 2011 England riots).

Kill it Kid have toured the UK and Ireland extensively as well as throughout Europe, with occasional US appearances.  They have played festivals including South by Southwest (Austin, Texas), and Hop Farm in 2010 (headlined by Bob Dylan).

Their song "Run" featured on the 2013 Samsung commercial "Charge" Directed by Romain Gavras.  The commercial depicts a man sitting on a beach with scenes from multiple movies rushing at him before he uses voice and motion control to select a movie.

Break
On 13 November 2015 they announced on their Facebook fan page that they will be taking an indefinite break. Chris Turpin and Stephanie Jean from the band posted that they got married in December 2016. As of 2019 Kill It Kid has been completely dissolved and former members Chris Turpin and Stephanie Jean have created a new band called Ida Mae.

Members

Current members
 Chris Turpin – guitar, vocals
 Stephanie Ward – piano, vocals
 Marc Jones – drums  
 Dom Kozubik  – bass – (2011–present)

Former members
 Richard Jones – violin, backing vocals.  Left band in 2011.  Credits: 'Burst its Banks' EP;'Kill It Kid' album
 Adam Timmins – bass, banjo.  Left band in 2011.  Credits: 'Burst its Banks' EP; 'Kill It Kid' album; 'Feet Fall Heavy' album

Discography

Studio albums
 Kill it Kid (October 2009, One Little Indian Records)
 Feet Fall Heavy (September 2011, One Little Indian Records)
 You Owe Nothing (September 2014, Sire Records / Warner Bros. Records)

Live albums
 Live From Good Luck Studio (Tour CD-R 2011, One Little Indian Records)
 Abbey Road (Tour CD-R 2014, Sire Records)

Singles and EPs
 Burst Its Banks, LTD edition EP (2008)
 "Send Me an Angel Down", single (May 2009, One Little Indian Records)
 "Burst Its Banks", single (August 2009, One Little Indian Records)
 "Heaven Never Seemed So Close" single (October 2009, One Little Indian Records)
 "Pray on Me", single (March 2011, One Little Indian Records)
 "Wild & Wasted Waters", single (November 2011, One Little Indian Records)
 "Caroline", single (July 2014, Sire Records)
 "Blood Stop And Run", single (2015, #20 US Mainstream Rock Songs)

References

External links
 Official Kill it Kid website

British blues musical groups
English blues musicians
English rock music groups
One Little Independent Records artists
Warner Records artists